The Icaro Pit-Trike is an Italian electric-powered ultralight trike, designed by Manfred Ruhmer and produced by Icaro 2000 of Sangiano. The aircraft is supplied as a complete ready-to-fly-aircraft.

Design and development
The Pit-Trike was designed to comply with the Fédération Aéronautique Internationale microlight category and the US FAR 103 Ultralight Vehicles rules. It features a cable-braced hang glider-style high-wing, weight-shift controls, a single-seat open cockpit without a cockpit fairing, tricycle landing gear and a single electric motor in pusher configuration.

The aircraft is made from bolted-together aluminum tubing, with its single or double surface wing covered in Dacron sailcloth. Its wing is supported by a single tube-type kingpost and uses an "A" frame weight-shift control bar. Initially Simonini and Bailey gasoline engines were offered, but currently only electric motors are available. The current standard powerplant is a brushless, rotating-can  Flytec HPD 10 electric motor. With the standard 24 Ah lithium ion battery endurance is 20 minutes. With two batteries connected in parallel, providing 48 Ah, the flight endurance is 40 minutes.

A number of different wings can be fitted to the basic carriage, including the single surface Icaro RX2 18 or 21 or the double surface Icaro MastR large size.

Specifications (Pit-Trike with Icaro MastR wing)

References

External links

2000s Italian sport aircraft
2000s Italian ultralight aircraft
Single-engined pusher aircraft
Electric aircraft
Ultralight trikes